Chen Barag Banner (Mongolian:    Qaɣučin Barɣu qosiɣu, Mongolian Cyrillic: Хуучин Барга хошуу) is a banner of northeastern Inner Mongolia, People's Republic of China.

History 
The area was part of the Han dynasty, Tang dynasty, Liao Dynasty, and Yuan dynasty, and is still home to historical ruins from these eras.

The Chen Barag Banner is named after the Barga Mongols, who inhabited the area prior its official organization.

The area of the present-day Chen Barag Banner was organized by the Qing Dynasty in 1732.

The current iteration of the Chen Barag Banner was organized in 1919, but has undergone numerous administrative and boundary changes since then.

Economy 
The banner is home to vast grasslands, which host a number of tourist attractions. The area is also home to various mineral deposits, which include coal, iron, copper, and zinc.

Transportation 
National Highway 301 and Inner Mongolia Provincial Highway 201 both pass through the banner. Additionally, the Binzhou Railway also passes through the banner.

Administrative divisions
Since restructuring in 2011, the Chen Barag Banner has maintained jurisdiction over three towns and four sums.

Climate

References

Banners of Inner Mongolia
Hulunbuir